The NHS Gender Identity Development Service (GIDS) is a nationally operated health clinic in the United Kingdom that specialises in working with children with gender identity issues, including gender dysphoria. Launched in 1989, GIDS is commissioned by NHS England and takes referrals from across the UK, although it is operated at a Tavistock and Portman NHS Foundation Trust site. GIDS is the only gender identity clinic for people under 18 in England and Wales and is the subject of much controversy. In July 2022, the NHS decided to close GIDS and replace it with regional healthcare centres in 2023, following the release of an interim report on the provision of gender identity services for children and adolescents conducted by paediatrician Hilary Cass.

History

Pre-establishment 

GIDS is a service provided by the Tavistock Clinic. Originally located at Tavistock Square in London, the clinic specialised in psychiatric care. The Tavistock Clinic treated both adults and children, with their first patient being a child. However, it mainly focused on military psychology, including shell-shock, now termed PTSD. In 1948, with the creation of the NHS, the Tavistock Clinic launched its children's department, which developed many works by Robertson and Bowlby on attachment theory. In 1959, it opened an adolescent department and in 1967 it was absorbed into the London Child Guidance Clinic. The Tavistock Clinic established GIDS in 1989. GIDS was founded by Domenico Di Ceglie, a child and adolescent psychiatrist.

Childhood mental health services 

Child and Adolescent Mental Health Services (CAMHS) provides the NHS support for children with mental health issues. However, CAMHS is organised by local government area and thus coverage varies significantly. The development of CAMHS within a four-tiered framework started in 1995. In 2000 the NHS Plan Implementation Programme required health and local authorities to jointly produce a local CAMHS strategy.

GIDS takes referrals from all mental health care professionals, especially Tier 2 and 3 CAMHS specialists. GIDS is distinct from CAMHS as is it is nationally run, not by the local authority. However, in the CAMHS framework it sits in Tier 4, as a highly specialised service.

In 1989 when the GIDS opened, "it got two referrals over the whole year."

Recent history 
In 2009–10, 97 patients were referred to GIDS. By 2015–16, this had increased fourteen-fold to 1,419 and in 2017–18 to 2,519. Due to reduced funding and increased referrals, the average wait time is two years from referral to first appointment.

In 2010–11, the GIDS lowered the age of prescription for the puberty blocker drug from 15 to 10 years old after facing pressure from activists and from people who would otherwise need to travel to America or Holland to obtain the drug.

In 2012, the service was extended to a satellite site in Leeds. Endocrine support was also extended to Leeds Children's Hospital at the Leeds General Infirmary site in 2013.

In 2016, the waiting list for the clinic had increased to nine months.

In 2016, the clinic was the subject of a Channel 4 documentary programme, told from the point of view of two satisfied trans children and their families.

In November 2018, the parents of patients complained in a letter to the Trust board about the alacrity at which diagnoses were rendered, leaving them unable to intervene in these "life-altering decisions". This led to the commissioning of an internal report by Dr David Bell, which concluded in February 2019 that the service was "not fit for purpose", as children were being prescribed experimental drugs "after a few sessions and without proper investigation of their cases[...] under pressure from transgender rights groups". Bell urged the suspension of "all experimental hormone treatment for children who wished to change gender until there was better evidence of the outcomes." Dr Marcus Evans, a member of the Tavistock and Portman NHS Foundation Trust governance board, resigned that week after a 35-year association with Tavistock and Portman. He accused its management of having an "overvalued belief in" the expertise of GIDS, "which is used to dismiss challenge and examination."

Subsequent to the Bell report it was revealed that 35 psychologists had resigned since 2016, including six psychologists who claimed there was "over-diagnosis" of gender dysphoria and a push for early medical intervention, because "psychologists fear being branded transphobic."

In February 2019, it was revealed that the National Institute for Health Research (NIHR) had announced a £1.3 million grant for a study following young people referred to GIDS, to compare mental and physical health outcomes for children referred. The study was to compare the effectiveness of different interventions, including psychological, endocrinological, pharmaceutical and alternative interventions.

In July 2019, the Tavistock Centre was flooded, which temporarily affected the IT servers at the clinic.

In October 2019, a lawsuit was launched against GIDS by the mother of a patient at GIDS and Sue Evans, a nurse who formerly worked there. Later, Evans passed their role as complainant to Keira Bell, a previous service user. In December 2020 following the High Court judgement, GIDS suspended all new referrals to endocrinology. The Court granted a stay on further implementation of the judgement until 22 December 2020 or until appeals are exhausted. The judgment was overturned by the Court of Appeal in 2021.

In December 2020 Dr Bell, a former governor of the Trust who was elected by the medical staff and who had produced in February 2019 a report on the methods of the GIDS, reported that he now faced "disciplinary action" from the Trust. The threats to take disciplinary action lapsed when Dr Bell retired in 2021.

Leadership 
Dr Polly Carmichael, a consultant clinical psychologist, has led the GIDS since at least 2016.

Services 
Services provided include:

 Assessments, to assess primary medical aims and necessary support;
 Gender development support, including access to therapy, tailored support and therapy groups;
 Physical intervention, including endocrinological intervention such as puberty blockers and sex hormones;
 Mental health support, usually working alongside CAMHS;
 Ongoing support post social or medical transition and referral to adult gender identity services.

No surgical transition options are available through GIDS.

People referred to GIDS may also contribute to NIHR studies into gender dysphoria in children.

Referrals 
In the financial year 2018–19, 31 referrals were made for children aged 5 or under. 30 referrals were made for adults over the age of 18. In 2018–19, there was a year-on-year increase of 6%, a relative plateau compared to previous year-on-year increases. Similarly, there was only a 0.1% increase in referrals between the 18–19 and 19–20 financial years.

More than 5,000 children were referred there in 2021, a 20-fold increase over the previous decade, leading to "unacceptable" waiting lists.

Children who present to GIDS may identify with a number of different labels, including non-binary, transgender, genderqueer, questioning or otherwise as simply dysphoric or gender non-conforming. GIDS say that the way children identify is changing, which may be due to cultural and societal shifts.

Controversy 
As the only gender identity clinic for children in England and Wales, GIDS has been the subject of much controversy related to the broader topic of gender dysphoria and transitioning in childhood.

High resignation rate 
A 2019 Sky News report found that 35 psychologists resigned between 2016 and 2019. Six psychologists who resigned raised concerns about the over-diagnosis and medicalisation of young people experiencing gender identity difficulties. In February 2019, Tavistock trust member Marcus Evans resigned, citing similar concerns. In July 2019, Kirsty Entwistle wrote a public letter about the GIDS service, saying professionals were often labelled "transphobic" if they raised doubts. Clinicians have stated that concerns over children's welfare were "shut down".

Bell Report 
Following a letter to the board at Tavistock, an internal report was commissioned to look at the functioning of GIDS. Dr David Bell authored the report which found that the service was "not fit for purpose". It considered that the service could result in "damaging consequences" to children's lives and failed to fully consider a child's mental health background. However, it did not identify any "immediate" issues with regards to safety and in 2018 the Care Quality Commission (CQC) rated the effectiveness of the Trust as "outstanding".

Conversely, there is a long wait time for a first appointment at GIDS, averaging at two years as of January 2020. GIDS blame high referral numbers and low staff numbers for this wait time.

Leeds lawsuit (Bell v Tavistock) 

In October 2019, a legal complaint was lodged against GIDS at its satellite site in Leeds. The suit was brought by "Mrs. A", a mother of a 15-year-old patient with autism, and Sue Evans, a former nurse at the Leeds GIDS satellite site. It alleges that advice around hormone therapy was "potentially misleading" and that true informed consent could not be given under such circumstances. The suit describes hormone therapy as "experimental" and states that there is "robust evidence" to show long-lasting medical effects of hormone therapy. Some time after January 2020, Evans passed on her role as complainant to Keira Bell "who was prescribed puberty blockers by GIDS when she was 16. She had a double mastectomy aged 20, and now regrets transitioning, which has left her with 'no breasts, a deep voice, body hair, a beard, affected sexual function and who knows what else that has not been discovered'. She may well be infertile as a side effect of the drugs." In a judgment delivered on 1 December 2020, the judges said that it was "highly unlikely that a child aged 13 or less would be competent to give consent to the administration of puberty blockers", and that it was "doubtful that 14 or 15 year olds could understand the long-term risks and consequences" of this form of treatment. Where the young person is 16 or over, "we recognise that clinicians may well regard these as cases where the authorisation of the court should be sought prior to commencing the clinical treatment." The judges also criticised GIDS for failing to publish a 2011 study relating to puberty blockers. Immediately following the High Court judgement, GIDS suspended all new referrals to endocrinology. The Court granted a stay on further implementation of the judgement until 22 December 2020 or until the appeal process was complete, whichever was later. Amnesty International and Liberty issued a joint statement emphasising their concern on "the wider implications this will have on the rights of children and young people of all genders, particularly on consent and bodily autonomy." Consortium issued a statement stating that the ruling "could have a potentially devastating impact on young people seeking access to medical services." Leave to appeal against the decision of the High Court was granted in January 2021. The appeal was heard on 23 and 24 June 2021.

In September 2021, the Court of Appeal overturned the judgment of the High Court and once again allowed people under 16 to consent to receiving puberty blockers.

Royal College of General Practitioners (RCGP) position 
The RCGP report on transgender healthcare in the UK found several flaws in the NHS approach. It called for a "whole system" change, including addressing waiting times and the lack of research around gender dysphoria in children. The report noted the expansion of gender identity services into all four UK nations and "welcomes the forthcoming postgraduate diploma in Gender Identity Healthcare Practice". The report also noted that "in England, for example, GICs have seen a 240% overall increase in referrals over five years, with referrals to the Tavistock and Portman clinic alone increasing 8.43% between March 2018-19."

Sonia Appleby employment tribunal case 
In July 2020, it was reported that Sonia Appleby, the "Named Professional for Safeguarding Children" at the gender identity clinic, had been in dispute with her employers since November 2019.

In September 2021, it was reported that Appleby was awarded £20,000 by an employment tribunal because the NHS's Tavistock and Portman trust's treatment of her damaged her professional reputation and "prevented her from proper work on safeguarding". The trust will not be lodging an appeal.

Academics Judith Suissa and Alice Sullivan listed her alongside Allison Bailey, Maya Forstater, and J. K. Rowling as women who have experienced campaigns of harassment because they speak publicly on sex and gender identity.

The Cass Review 
In 2020, the NHS commissioned paediatrician and former President of the Royal College of Paediatrics and Child Health Hilary Cass to lead a review into gender identity services for children and young people.

The interim report of The Cass Review was published in March 2022. It said that the rise in referrals had led to the staff being overwhelmed, and recommended the creation of a network of regional hubs to provide care and support to young people. The report noted that the clinical approach used by GIDS "has not been subjected to some of the usual control measures" typically applied with new treatments, and raised concerns about the lack of data collection by GIDS.

The interim report also said that Cass considered that GPs and other non-GIDS staff felt "under pressure to adopt an unquestioning affirmative approach" to children unsure of their gender, "overshadowing" other issues such as poor mental health. The Tavistock and Portman NHS Foundation Trust said "being respectful of someone's identity does not preclude exploration", and "We agree that support should be holistic, based on the best available evidence and that no assumptions should be made about the right outcome for any given young person."

Some criticisms that the Association of Clinical Psychologists (ACP) drew from the Cass interim review were: GIDS took an approach that was predominantly affirmative, rather than exploratory; assessment was not standardised; mental health and neurodevelopmental assessments were not conducted comprehensively, leading to ‘diagnostic overshadowing’ whereby gender dysphoria was attended to without taking into account any co-existing diagnoses; safeguarding processes were lacking. In response, an open letter signed by more than forty clinical psychologists described the statement by the ACP as ‘misleading’ and said that it ‘perpetuates damaging discourses about the work and gender-diverse identities more broadly’. Roughly half of the signatories were current or former senior employees at GIDS.

Closure decision 
The interim Cass report had found the clinic's model to be "neither safe nor viable" due to its lengthy waiting periods, which were deemed "unacceptable", as well as its overshadowing of mental health issues other than gender identity. On 28 July 2022, the NHS decided to close GIDS and replace it with regional healthcare centres, following the publication of the review. The regional centres are intended to provide more "holistic care", linking to other mental health services. Two of them will be established by spring 2023—one at the Great Ormond Street Hospital in London and another under a partnership between the Alder Hey Children's Hospital in Liverpool and the Royal Manchester Children's Hospital. Minors being considered for hormone treatment would be followed until adulthood as part of formal clinical trials.

In response to the decision, Susie Green, then CEO of Mermaids, a campaign group for youth who question their gender, was "cautiously optimistic", but expressed concerns that priority would be given to mental health over medical care. She said: "We would not want any further barriers to be put in place in terms of access to medical intervention."

In February 2023, documentary journalist Hannah Barnes published a book on GIDS, titled Time to Think: The Inside Story of the Collapse of the Tavistock's Gender Service for Children. Barnes describes the work saying, "I wanted to write a definitive record of what happened [at GIDS] because there needs to be one."

See also 

 Transitioning (transgender)
 Transgender health care
 Transgender rights in the United Kingdom
 Childhood gender nonconformity
 Gender dysphoria in children
 Transgender youth

References 

Transgender and medicine
NHS trusts
National Health Service (England)